Thomas Ambrose Tschoepe (December 17, 1915 – January 24, 2009) was an American prelate of the Roman Catholic Church.  He served as the second bishop of the Diocese of San Angelo in Texas from 1966 to 1969 and as the fifth bishop of the Diocese of Dallas in Texas from 1969 to 1990.

Biography 
Thomas Tschoepe was born on December 17, 1915, in Pilot Point, Texas.  He was ordained a priest by Archbishop John Timothy McNicholas for the Diocese of Dallas on May 30, 1943.

Bishop of San Angelo 
On January 12, 1966, Tschoepe was appointed bishop of the Diocese of San Angelo by Pope Paul VI.  Tschoepe was consecrated by Bishop Thomas Kiely Gorman on March 9, 1966.

Bishop of Dallas 
On August 227, 1969, Tschoepe was appointed bishop of the Diocese of Dallas by Pope Paul VI.  He was installed on October 29, 1969.

During Tschoepe's administration, 21 counties in East Texas were split off into the new Diocese of Tyler, reducing the Dallas Diocese to 9 counties and a little over 7,000 square miles.  As bishop, Tschoepe attended a presentation at Holy Trinity Seminary (Dallas) by Paul Shanley, who spoke of the positive effects of sexual relations between adult males and teenagers.  Tschoepe made no objection to this presentation...but He did not condone it either.

Retirement and legacy 
Tschoepe retired on July 14, 1990, and was succeeded by Bishop Charles Grahmann.  During the early part of his retirement, Tschoepe lived and served at St. Joseph's Parish in Waxahachie, Texas.  In his later years he lived at the St. Joseph Retirement Center in south Dallas. 

In 1995, it was revealed during a civil lawsuit that Tschoepe had repeatedly ignored reports about a diocesan priest, Rudy Kos, participating in sleepovers and inappropriate physical conduct with young boys during the 1980's.  In 1991, a therapist who evaluated Kos termed him a classic textbook pedophile. After an appeal, the diocese agreed in 1998 to pay $23.4 to eight victims of Kos.  That same year, he was sentenced to life in prison for sexually molesting several boys.

Thomas Tschoepe died on January 24, 2009, at age 93.

References

External links
Bishop Thomas Ambrose Tschoepe profile, Catholic-Hierarchy.org; accessed May 18, 2018.

1915 births
2009 deaths
20th-century Roman Catholic bishops in the United States
People from Pilot Point, Texas
Roman Catholic Ecclesiastical Province of San Antonio
Roman Catholic bishops of Dallas